The Last Full Measure is a 2004 short film written and directed by Alexandra Kerry, daughter of U.S. Democratic Senator John Kerry. Set in 1973, during the Vietnam War, it explores the emotions of a nine-year-old girl awaiting her father's return from the war. The cast includes 24 stars Xander Berkeley and Reiko Aylesworth.

The title is drawn from the Gettysburg Address of President Abraham Lincoln.

External links

2004 films
2004 short documentary films
Vietnam War films
2000s English-language films
American short documentary films